Elevator surfing, also known as lift surfing, is an activity involving riding on top of elevators, rather than inside them. More advanced surfers may also attempt riskier maneuvers like jumping between moving elevators and riding the elevator's counterweight. It is typically considered a form of urban exploration, more aligned with investigative experiences like rooftopping and tunnel hacking rather than adrenaline-inducing urban sports like train surfing. While elevator surfing was most prominent as a subculture in the United States and United Kingdom in the 1990s, it made a comeback in the late 2010s, with partakers often posting footage of their adventures on YouTube and similar platforms.

Entry into the elevator shaft is often achieved using an elevator key -- like those carried by first responders and building maintenance staff -- to open the outer doors. Alternatively, participants may utilize lock picking techniques or use tools like coat hangers to force the elevator car's doors open between floors and unlatch the outer doors from the inside. Elevators surfers usually can't use the emergency hatch in the roof of the elevator to access the shaft, as these are designed for first responder use and can't be opened from the inside. 

Elevator surfing typically occurs in skyscrapers or on college campuses, especially those with tall buildings. Participation is often illegal, and, if caught, surfers may face other charges like trespassing.

Origins
Although the first instances of elevator surfing are unknown, by 1990, the activity was noted for its popularity among children in New York City public housing projects. Children as young as six partook in the activity, often as a  game of chicken. During the same time period, elevator surfing became popular on college campuses, especially along the  East Coast.

Hazards
Elevator surfers can be crushed between the elevator and the top or sides of the elevator shaft, be struck by the counterweight, or slip and fall to their deaths.
The surfer has the ability to stop the elevator by pressing the emergency stop button on the roof of the elevator car, decreasing the risk of being crushed against the top of the shaft.

Injuries and deaths
In November 1989, twelve-year-old Walter McMillan of Harlem, New York City, was found dead on top of an elevator car in a local housing complex where he had been playing; his legs had been crushed between the car and a beam, resulting in his death. Walter had been a member of the "Little Tough Guys", a group of roughly thirty-five children known for elevator surfing, and police had tried to warn him of the dangers of the activity.

In March 1990, University of Massachusetts Amherst student Joel Mangion was found dead in the bottom of an elevator shaft at his dormitory. Friends reported that he had been jumping from one car to another in the double shaft. While attempting the jump, he slipped and became wedged between the cab and the wall, falling sixteen stories to his death.

In March 1991, twenty-three-year-old Indiana State University aviation student Michael Deliduka and his peers used a coat hanger to wedge open elevator doors after a night of drinking. They gained access to the tops of the elevators and subsequently attempted to move between them. While Deliduka was attempting to fix a stuck elevator, it activated, pinning him between the carriage and another elevator part and killing him instantly.

In September 1992, Southern Methodist University student and athlete Michael Schlosser slipped while hanging onto the bottom of an elevator, falling thirty feet through the shaft and succumbing to blunt force head injuries. His companion also fell the same distance but only sustained a broken arm. The event prompted SMU to install safety locks on elevator doors so that they could not be pried open with hangers or other tools and would instead only open when an elevator is present.

In May 1997, ten-year-old Paul Illingworth was discovered dead at the bottom of an elevator shaft in his Leeds housing estate. He had been riding on the top of the elevator and fell eight floors to his death. In April 1999, fourteen-year-old Jason Nolan of Dublin died after becoming trapped between the elevator walls and mechanism at the top of the shaft in the elevator at his apartment complex. Another resident who had been in the elevator at the time of the accident reported a sudden shaking followed by a halt and heard Nolan's friends screaming and a breathing sound that subsequently stopped.

In December 2006, eighteen-year-old Jonathan Figueroa was found dead at the bottom of an elevator shaft in a Bedford Stuyvesant apartment complex. He was likely in the shaft for two to three days.

See also

 Car surfing
 List of train surfing injuries and deaths
 Skitching
 Train surfing

References 

Accidents
Surfing
Urban exploration